Elwood is an unincorporated community in Fannin County, Texas, United States.

The Sam Rayburn Independent School District serves area students.

External links
 

Unincorporated communities in Texas
Unincorporated communities in Fannin County, Texas